Graužiai is a village in Kėdainiai district municipality, in Kaunas County, in central Lithuania. According to the 2011 census, the village was uninhabited.

In Soviet era it was in Kunioniai selsovet.

Demography

References

Villages in Kaunas County
Kėdainiai District Municipality